Stamatios Kolethras (born 6 February 1964) is a Greek boxer. He competed in the men's featherweight event at the 1984 Summer Olympics. At the 1984 Summer Olympics, he lost to Ali Faki of Malawi.

References

1964 births
Living people
Greek male boxers
Olympic boxers of Greece
Boxers at the 1984 Summer Olympics
Place of birth missing (living people)
Featherweight boxers
20th-century Greek people